Evergreen Cemetery is a cemetery located in Tannersville, Greene County, New York. It holds graves dating to the 1810s.

Notable graves
 Judd Bruce Doyle, aka, Slow Joe Doyle, (1881–1947), professional baseball player

References

Further reading

External links
 Tannersville Evergreen Cemetery in Tannersville, New York, CountyOffice.org
 
    

Cemeteries in Greene County, New York
Cemeteries established in the 1810s
1810s establishments in New York (state)